Marry My Dead Body is a 2023 Taiwanese supernatural comedy mystery film directed by Cheng Wei-hao and starring Greg Hsu, Austin Lin, and Gingle Wang. The film premiered at the Taipei Golden Horse Film Festival on November 17, 2022, and it will be officially released in Taiwan on February 10, 2023. The story combines traditional ghost marriage customs with police handling case, in the process of finding the truth, an affection between human and ghost is started.

Plot 
The homophobic and ghost-phobic straight policeman Wu Ming-han (Greg Hsu), who mistakenly picks up a red envelope while investigating evidence in a case, meets Mao Mao (Austin Lin), who was discussing marriage with his boyfriend but died unjustly because of an accident. Mao Mao's grandma (Wang Man-Chiao), who is reluctant to let her grandson die before getting married, comes up with the idea of ghost marriage, and the two are forced to get married. Unwilling to give in, Wu Ming-han began to have bad luck, not only could he not get rid of his ghost marriage partner, he even messes up the anti-drug case that the policewoman Lin Tzu-ching (Gingle Wang) has been working on for a long time. To cut off the marriage, he has no choice and decides to solve case together with his "ghost husband" Mao Mao, finding out the culprit and avenge Mao Mao, so that embarking on a journey full of absurdity and tears.

Cast 
 Greg Hsu as Wu Ming-han
 Austin Lin as Mao Pang-yu (Mao Mao)
 Gingle Wang as Lin Tzu-ching
 Tsai Chen-nan as Lin Hsiao-yuan
 Wang Man-Chiao as Mao Chen A-lan
 Tuo Tsung-hua as Mao Cheng-kuo
 Ma Nieh-hsien as Chang Yung-kang
 Cheng Chih-wei as Temple Master
 Chen Yen-tso as Chubby
 Chang Zhang-xing as A-Gao
 Cliff Cho as Hsiao-Ma
 Kurt Hsiao as district police officer
 Liu Kuan-ting as Police Officer
 Aaron Yan as Chen Chia-hao
 Chris Lee as Chia-hao's boy friend

Production 
Director Cheng Wei-hao won a Golden Harvest Award and a Golden Horse Award for Best Live Action Short Film for the short film, The Death of a Security Guard (2014), and he collaborated with producer Jin Bai-lun on the film, The Soul (2021), which was nominated a Golden Horse Award for Best Adapted Screenplay; In the same year, the two co-produced the film, Man in Love (2021), which was produced by the original team of this film. He also cooperated with Sharon Wu, who wrote the television series, In a Good Way (2013), to adapt the script of the film for the first time. In November 2021, Cheng attended the Golden Horse Awards Nominee Party for The Soul, and revealed that he has started to prepare to shoot his next film, with a black humor theme and Greg Hsu as the leading actor. In December 2021, the film crew held an opening ceremony, revealing that another leading actor is Austin Lin. In January 2022, the filming was officially completed.

Cheng said in an exclusive interview that he has always wanted to try to make comedy, for him, comedy is another aspect of him, he is good at shooting horror and thriller themes, many of his previous works also have elements of black humor. When setting the style of this film, he believed that comedy is the first element, in addition, he wants to break the stereotype through this work, starts the story with "turning misunderstanding into understanding" as the main concept, and unprecedentedly integrates comedy with various elements such as Taiwan's ghost marriage customs, same-sex marriage, action, speeding car chase, etc., after the story style is established, the relationship, emotion, and humanity between the characters are described solidly in a playful and gag way, making the film full of laughter and tears. It is full of warmth and even humorously brought into serious issues of contemporary concern, which he believes is a very important part. Since his first feature film The Tag-Along (2015), Cheng conducts a "blind test" before finalizing the cut, he cares a lot about the audience's thoughts on films, and believes that as a creator, it is easy to have "blind spots", many times think the plots and concepts to be expressed are clearly described, but in fact they are not, "blind testing" can help understand whether the audience has questions about film and whether they understand it, after receiving feedback from audience, relevant adjustments can be made to improve audience acceptance. Every time he creates, he will think about "what types of films are lacking in the Taiwan market", and then continue to explore, excavate, and develop, try more diverse and rich types in terms of subject matter and technology, challenge and reach different new fields.

Producers Jin Bai-lun and Dennis Wu served as judges of the 1st Let's Be Wild in 2018, Lai Chih-liang won the First Prize for Best Creative Story in the contest for the original story of the film, at that time, the two liked the story very much, and Lai also won the Bucheon First Prize at the Bucheon International Fantastic Film Festival in 2020 for this story. The film crew began to plan the film after the Let's Be Wild contest, and carried out a long process of script adaptation, and also overcame many difficulties and challenges for many rarely tried film techniques. The director and the leading actors mentioned that due to the use of a large number of special effects in the film, the shooting and post-production are quite complicated. In addition to the basic rivalry, the actors often have to perform one-man shows against the green screen, the air, or a certain point of view. This is a rare form for the crew and actors, and the three leading actors also agreed that this is the biggest challenge during filming.

Casting 

Greg Hsu, who was nominated a Golden Bell Award for Best Leading Actor in a Television Series for Someday or One Day (2019), plays Wu Ming-han, a straight policeman who is passionate and impulsive in handling cases. Director Cheng Wei-hao expressed that he saw Hsu's potential before he became popular because of the series, and the deal was reached shortly after he proposed the invitation. Hsu said that it is a great honor to cooperate with excellent directors and actors. When he saw the script for the first time, he was attracted by fresh and interesting themes, he believes that this role needs to have a sense of physique, in order to meet the state of the role, he spent several months doing physical exercise before shooting. He said that Wu Ming-han was a very difficult role for him. He had many performances that broke through the "shame" in the film. In addition to action scenes, he even had to be naked during a wire-flying, which made him feel like he had fallen into the director's trap, but at the same time he also want to challenge his own scale bottom line.

Austin Lin, who won a Golden Horse Award for Best Supporting Actor for At Cafe 6 (2016), plays Mao Pang-yu (Mao Mao), a gay ghost who died of injustice. He believes that how to grasp the rhythm of comedy when filming this film is a big challenge for him. He said that Mao Mao is the largest scale but lonely role he has ever played. In the film, only Hsu, who is married to him in the ghost marriage, can see him, other actors can only "turn a blind eye" to him when they are shooting with him, which makes him feel as if he has cooperated with other actors or has not. He believes that Mao Mao is a very valuable and special character, and said that there are many gay friends like Mao Mao around him. He wants to let the audience know that there are many warm and lovely people like Mao Mao in this world through his performance.

Gingle Wang, who won a Taipei Film Award for Best Actress for Detention (2019), plays Lin Tzu-ching, a police officer who wants to get rid of the "eye candy" label. She said that watching the two leading actors play against each other during filming, she finally realized the joy of being a fujoshi. This time she played the role of a policewoman working among men, she believes that in today's society, being a woman is still vulnerable to discrimination, she wants to express what the character wants to prove through this film, which is full of challenges for her.

Music 

The film's theme song "Untitled" is performed by the Golden Melody Award-winner Jolin Tsai, who also participated in the songwriting and production. She and director Cheng Wei-hao had cooperated twice. Cheng said that when he came up with the theme song in the early stage of film preparation, he thought Tsai was the best choice. This cooperation started before the filming started. She was very interested after receiving the invitation, after carefully reading the script and the rough cut of the film, she spent more than a year creating, although got stuck several times, finally handed over a work that satisfied both director and herself, and expressed her feelings through singing. The song describes the process of being in love from ambiguity and confusion, searching and exploring, to suddenly enlightening, and the title of the song "Untitled" means that in this relationship that does not need to be defined, it has found the most comfortable ideal state. The song was officially released on December 9, 2022, and the music video was released on the same day. Directed by Yin Chen-hao, Cheng hopes to use the music video as a prequel story of the film, starring Austin Lin and Wang Man-chiao, using the characters in the film to interpret the grandparent-grandson closeness between Mao Mao and Grandma, the plot describes the process of sharing secrets with each other, understanding each other, and no longer being afraid to hide. On the same day, Tsai, Cheng, and Lin conducted a live broadcast on the film's official Instagram account, sharing behind-the-scenes stories of music and music video creation.

In addition to the theme song, the film also uses several Tsai's songs as interludes, and re-arranged them to match the plot, Cheng said that Tsai is representative of Taiwan's LGBT culture, and believes that her songs are quite suitable for the theme conveyed by the film. The soundtrack of the film was performed by the guitarist Kay Liu of Sodagreen, who won a Golden Bell Award for Best Score for a Drama Series for the series, The Pond (2021), where he and Cheng collaborated for the first time in this award-winning work. Cheng said that in the previous cooperation, Liu expressed his interest and enthusiasm in making film and television soundtracks, so he was invited again to take charge of the soundtrack production this time.

Release 
The Golden Horse International Film Festival announced on August 30, 2022 that this film has been selected as the closing film of 2022. On October 11, 2022, the film's official social media accounts were opened, and a film teaser was released. The film's festival version poster was released on October 17, 2022. A trailer was released on October 28, 2022. A poster was released on November 4, 2022. The premiere was held on November 17, 2022. Cheng Wei-hao, Jin Bai-lun, and Dennis Wu, Greg Hsu, Austin Lin, and Gingle Wang all attended the premiere event. Cheng said that the premiere version was a "limited edition" exclusively for the Golden Horse Film Festival. In fact, there was still one month before the completion of the film's post-production period, and post-production adjustments would be made before the official release.

References

External links 
 
 
 

2023 comedy films
2023 horror films
2023 films
2023 LGBT-related films
Films shot in Taipei
Taiwanese comedy films
Taiwanese LGBT-related films
Taiwanese supernatural horror films
LGBT-related comedy films